A , abbreviated in English as "Y.K." or "Co., Ltd.", is a form of business organization in Japan.

 are based on the German  and were implemented in Japan in the Limited Company Act of 1940. Following the implementation, no new YKs were allowed in Japan, but pre-existing YKs were allowed to continue their operations as kabushiki gaisha under special rules.

While it is pronounced  in standard Japanese, the alphabetic abbreviation is always Y.K. by standard.

Structure

As of 2005, a Y.K. can have up to 50 investors, called . The members were required to provide at least ¥3 million in capital contributions, with each  valued at no less than ¥50,000. The minimum capital amount was much more permissive than the ¥10 million minimum for a kabushiki gaisha. A Y.K. was also not required to issue certificates for investment units, whereas stock certificates were required for a K.K.

Unlike a K.K., a Y.K. does not need to have a board of directors or statutory auditors: the minimum requirement is one .

Because of its simplified structure and relatively lax incorporation requirements, the Y.K. form is associated with small businesses. However, some larger companies have used the form: ExxonMobil's principal Japanese subsidiary, for instance, is a Y.K. with paid-in capital of ¥50 billion (US$420 million). In addition to simplified corporate governance, a Y.K. receives some tax benefits under foreign laws such as the U.S. Internal Revenue Code.

References

Types of business entity
Japanese business law
Japanese business terms
1940 establishments in Japan
2006 disestablishments in Japan